Janne Reinikainen (born 10 March 1969) is a Finnish actor. He appeared in more than sixty films since 1991.

Selected filmography

References

External links 

1969 births
Living people
Finnish male film actors